Mawr means big or great in Welsh. Notable people with the surname include:

Beli Mawr, an ancestor figure in medieval Welsh literature and genealogies
Tewdwr Mawr, 6th century king in Brittany and Cornwall

See also
Marr (surname)

Welsh-language surnames